Franklin College is a private liberal arts college in Franklin, Indiana. It was founded in 1834 and has a wooded campus spanning 207 acres including athletic fields and a 31-acre biology woodland. The college offers its approximately 1,000 students Bachelor of Arts degrees in 49 majors from 25 academic disciplines, 43 minors, 11 pre-professional programs and five cooperative programs. The college also offers a Master of Science in Athletic Training and a Master of Science in Physician Assistant Studies.  In 1842, the college began admitting women, becoming the first coeducational institution in Indiana and the seventh in the nation. Franklin College has historically maintained an affiliation with the American Baptist Churches USA.

History

Franklin College was originally founded in 1834 as the Indiana Baptist Manual-Labor Institute, a manual labor college. Ten years later, the Indiana General Assembly changed the school's name to Franklin College.

Academics
The school offers major topics of study, including biology, chemistry, journalism, art, political science, theatre and music. There are 49 majors from 25 academic disciplines, 43 minors, 11 pre-professional programs, two master's programs and five cooperative programs.  Individualized majors and minors are also available.

Franklin College places a large emphasis on the liberal arts and sciences curriculum, requiring students to reorient themselves with standard mathematics, world history, literature, English and speech skills as well as take one class in the following categories: fine arts, life sciences, social sciences, intercultural, international and philosophy/religion, regardless of their intended major and/or minor.   All students also must complete at least one internship during their years at Franklin College and many majors require an internship for a semester.

In addition to the traditional fall and spring semesters, a month-long term in January is also held as most students wouldn't be able to acquire all necessary credits and liberal arts requirements through just the two main semesters.  During this time, students can take classes for credit (one Immersive Term class is required to graduate), including a few not offered during the rest of the year (topics have ranged from immigration to computer animation to Alfred Hitchcock), do internships for their majors and take travel courses to foreign countries that satisfy the international requirement for the Liberal Arts curriculum.   Trips to England, France and Ireland are quite common, but other locations have included Uganda, Costa Rica, Senegal and Japan.  While many students take these courses through programs offered by the college, some make arrangements through other organizations and financial aid is also available for students who plan to study in foreign countries.  Though Immersive Term is the most common time for international travel, students also have the opportunities to stay for a semester or full year if their schedules allow it.

Rankings
 Ranked #1 national liberal arts college in Indiana by Washington Monthly - 2016
 Ranked 44th top national liberal arts college in the country by Washington Monthly - 2016
 The only Indiana college ranked in Money’s Top 50 for Most Value Added - 2015
 Ranked 9th in U.S. News & World Reports Best Value category and 11th among Best Regional Colleges in the Midwest - 2015

Campus
Located in Franklin, the college's  campus includes an athletic park and a  woodland for biology study.  Nearly all the buildings on campus are placed around an ellipse known as Dame Mall, named after John Dame, the first-ever graduate of Franklin College.

In 1962, a large statue of Benjamin Franklin was gifted to the college from the Indianapolis Typographical Union.  It is on campus today at the corner of Branigin Boulevard and Monroe Street.

The bronze "Ben Bench" outside the Napolitan Student Center was donated to the college in 2005 by Bohdan Mysko, a retired businessman and art collector.  He purchased the sculpture from artist George Lundeen in 1990. The sculpture was produced sixteenth in a series of the 20 identical ones that Lundeen created.

The Von Boll Welcome Center was opened in 2003 and houses the offices of admissions and financial aid.

The Napolitan Student Center, opened in 2004, is a hub of student activity on campus and home to the dining hall, the college bookstore, a large atrium, the Center for Diversity and Inclusion, the Student Activity Center, Grizzly Cafe, campus security office, conference rooms, counseling and health center, and the Branigin Room, which is used for lectures, award ceremonies and community functions.

Branigin Boulevard, opened in 2004, serves as the main entrance to campus.  The project was a collaboration between the college and the city of Franklin.

The Napolitan Alumni House was dedicated in 2005.  The historic three-story brick house once served as the home to college presidents.  It currently serves as a gathering place during special events as well as accommodations for visiting dignitaries.

Another hub of student activity is the Spurlock Center, which contains classroom space, a fitness center, gymnasium, indoor track, the Franklin College Athletic Hall of Fame and athletic offices. This is also where pep rallies, school assemblies, commencement and numerous presentations involving guest speakers are held.

Richardson Chapel hosts services and special events for students, faculty, staff and the community.

The Wellhouse that stands in Dame Mall was constructed in 1917 as a monument to the Class of 2016 and was built by Blanche Crawford, class of 1916.

The Dietz Center for Professional Development was dedicated in 1994.  It houses the offices of Leadership Johnson County at Franklin College and connects to the Dietz Residence Hall.

The Andrews-Dietz House on campus was dedicated in 2005 and houses the Marketing and Communications Offices.

Educational buildings

Old Main, the iconic clock tower located at the campus entrance, is used for classes in varying subjects.  It also houses offices for areas of campus such as Information Technology Services, Development and Alumni Engagement, the Business Office, the President's Office and a variety of faculty and staff offices. It also houses Custer Theatre where choir concerts and other functions take place. This building was almost completely destroyed by a fire on April 21, 1985.  On the stairwell landing is a wooden stand with a bronze bust of Benjamin Franklin that is known for having paint rubbed off its nose due to students touching it.  (College legend says doing so before an exam will bring good luck.) 
The Franklin College Science Center is the newest facility on campus and is where most undergraduate science classes are held.
The Franklin College Graduate Health Science Center opened in 2018 and is where the college's master's programs are housed.
Johnson Center for Fine Arts, called JCFA for short, was opened in 2001 and is where fine arts classes are held.  School plays also are performed here in Theatre Margot.
Shirk Hall, constructed in 1903, houses the Pulliam School of Journalism, is home to the Indiana High School Press Association and to radio station 89.5 WFCI and The Franklin, the college's student-run newspaper.
B.F. Hamilton Library has a 24-hour computer lab, auditorium, Academic Resource Center, Silent Study area (2nd floor) and Disability Services.

Old Main and Shirk Hall were listed on the National Register of Historic Places in 1975.

Residence Halls 
Elsey Hall is a predominately freshmen dormitory that has exclusively double rooms (with the exception of RA rooms, but others can use one as a single for a fee).  Originally, it was the only all-female dormitory on campus.  Elsey Hall is connected to the four Panhellenic suites belonging to the three (formerly four) sororities.
Hoover-Cline, two buildings connected by a glass tunnel and located in the center of campus, provides singles, doubles and quads (exclusive to Hoover).
Johnson-Dietz, for upperclassmen only, is two separate buildings and popular due to the residential suites with bay windows that are occupied by 3–4 people.  Many on campus refer to it as "The Sections" because several suites are grouped in a particular section marked by a letter.
Dietz Center, for upperclassmen only, offers single rooms and suites.  Popular for its environment, the attached Dietz Center for Professional Development building is also used for community purposes and houses offices.

All campus-owned residence halls have air-conditioning, host events organized by RAs, have Wi-Fi and free laundry facilities.

Themed and Greek Housing
Three of the five active fraternities currently have houses and provide residence to their members. Two other homes on campus are themed. One is used as housing for students enrolled in the college's master's programs.  The other is called the BOLD (Building Our Leaders Through Diversity) House, which aims to promote and understanding and respect for multiculturalism and diversity and to provide intellectual, social and cultural programs focused on multicultural enrichment. The BOLD community was displaced from its house in Spring 2019, and the Living-Learning Community now resides in Section A of the Johnson-Dietz residence hall.

Greek life 
Franklin College is home to five fraternities and three sororities that are active.  It's estimated that 40 percent of Franklin College students are involved in Greek Life. Of the fraternities, three out of the five provide  housing, whereas the sororities use reserved Panhellenic suites owned by the college for meetings, ceremonies and other activities. The Greek community plays an active role on campus and holds multiple philanthropic events throughout the year.

The fraternities include Sigma Alpha Epsilon (Indiana Alpha; 1892–present), Phi Delta Theta (Indiana Delta; 1860–present, suspended from 2016 to '19), Kappa Delta Rho (Epsilon; 1919–present, inactive from 1972 to '80), Lambda Chi Alpha (Kappa Gamma; 1924–present) and Tau Kappa Epsilon (Rho Upsilon; 1988–present).

The sororities that are currently active include Zeta Tau Alpha (Beta Theta; 1927–present), Delta Delta Delta (Delta Zeta; 1912–present) and Pi Beta Phi (Indiana Alpha; 1888–present).

At one point, Franklin College also had three additional sororities that are no longer active - Kappa Kappa Gamma (Nu; 1879–1884), Delta Gamma (Phi Alpha; 1995–2008) and Delta Zeta (Psi; 1920–1990).  The seemingly abandoned third of the four Panhellenic Suites on campus was used by Delta Gamma (they used it until they closed in Fall 2008).  Today, the suite is used by the fraternity without on-campus housing, Lambda Chi Alpha.  In addition, benches on campus have been dedicated to both chapters and there are display cases in the Napolitan Student Center in their honor that show photos, shirts and other insignia belonging to their members.

Athletics
Franklin College is a charter member of the Heartland Collegiate Athletic Conference and it still competes in this conference.  Originally, there was no official name that Franklin College teams competed as. Due to the college's affiliation with the Baptist church, names such as “The Fighting Baptists” was used.  One of the first documented uses of the name “Grizzlies” can be found in 1929. This name originates from the nickname of Ernest “Griz” Wagner. In the 1920s, Wagner coached the Franklin College basketball known as the Franklin Wonder Five (1918–1926), after having previously coached the core of the team in high school. This combination won three consecutive Indiana High School Championships (1920–1922) and in the 1922–1923 season, the team won 50 consecutive games, defeating Purdue University, University of Notre Dame, University of Illinois, and University of Wisconsin.

In NCAA Division III football, Franklin College has a rivalry with Hanover College dating from 1898. Since 1938, the annual winner of the game wins the Victory Bell, hence the name of the game, the “Victory Bell Game.”  As of November 16, 2019 Hanover leads the series 44–42–3.

The football team, the women's lacrosse team, and both the men's and women's soccer teams play at Faught Stadium. This field is named for Stewart “Red” Faught. Faught coached football at Franklin College for 32 years (1956–1988) and acquired a record of 160 wins. One of his players, Terry L. Hoeppner, went on to become the head football coach for Miami University and Indiana University.

Men's athletic teams include baseball, basketball, cross county, football, golf, soccer, swimming and diving, tennis and track and field.  Women's athletic teams include basketball, cross country, golf, lacrosse, soccer, softball, tennis, volleyball, swimming and diving and track and field.

Notable people

Notable alumni
 George Banta, printer whose company is credited for designing multiple Greek crests, influential figure in development of Phi Delta Theta and Delta Gamma (the sorority's only male initiate)
 Joe Benigno, sports radio personality
 Roger D. Branigin, Governor of Indiana
 Walter Coffey, seventh president of University of Minnesota
 Steven A. Cohen, academic, author, environmentalist, professor of Public Management and Environmental Policy at Columbia University
 Brad Crawford, College Football Hall of Fame inductee
 Elmer Davis, The New York Times editorial writer,  CBS radio newscaster, director of the United States Office of War Information, and Peabody Award recipient
 William G. Everson, major general in the United States Army and Chief of the National Guard Bureau
 Paul Franklin, running back for Chicago Bears from 1931 to 1933
 Christopher T. Gonzalez, LGBT activist
 Francis M. Griffith,  Indiana State Senator (1886–1894) and U.S. Representative (1897–1905)
 Terry Hoeppner, head football coach at Indiana University and Miami University.
 Ralph Isselhardt, American football player
 Eddy Jerman, inventor and an early expert in the techniques of medical radiography.
 Marjorie Main, actress
 Gareth Matthews, renowned philosopher and college philosophy professor at University of Virginia, University of Minnesota and most notably, University of Massachusetts Amherst
 Paul Monroe, notable collegiate history professor and author
 Jesse Overstreet, U.S. Representative
 Edna Parker, for a year, the world's oldest person (since Aug 13, 2007) (1893–2008)
 Fuzzy Vandivier, Hall of Fame basketball player.
 Arch West, marketing executive who developed Doritos.
 Gene White, original member of the basketball team that inspired the film Hoosiers
 Guilford M. Wiley, Wisconsin State Assemblyman
 Robert Wise, Academy Award-winning director and producer

Notable faculty
 Albert Berg, football coach, deaf football player and 40 year teacher at Indiana School for the Deaf
 John S. Hougham, professor, President of the Board, abolitionist, developer of the solar compass.
 Thomas Locker, art professor, author, illustrator and artist who later taught at Shimer College
 Homer Rainey, college president (1927–1931) who later served as president of Bucknell University (1931–1935), University of Texas at Austin (1939–1944) and Stephens College (1947–1956)
 Gene White, FC alumnus (see above), professor of mathematics, basketball coach, part of the basketball team that inspired the film, Hoosiers

References

External links
 
 Official athletics website
 The Franklin (student newspaper)

 
Liberal arts colleges in Indiana
Educational institutions established in 1834
Education in Johnson County, Indiana
Buildings and structures in Johnson County, Indiana
Tourist attractions in Johnson County, Indiana
American manual labor schools
1834 establishments in Indiana
Private universities and colleges in Indiana